Bob & Rose is a British television drama, originally screened in six one-hour episodes on the ITV network in the UK in Autumn 2001. It was produced by the independent Red Production Company, and was that company's first prime-time drama for the ITV network.

Bob & Rose was the inspiration for Jules & Mimi, the fictional British television show featured in Sex and the City.

Production
The series was written by Russell T Davies, who had previously been responsible for the much-discussed Channel 4 drama Queer as Folk, another Red Production Company programme.

Bob was played by stand-up comedian and actor Alan Davies (no relation to writer Russell), who was at the time best known for his lead role in the BBC television mystery series Jonathan Creek. Rose was played by actress Lesley Sharp, who was nominated for the BAFTA and Royal Television Society Best Actress awards for the part. Although critically well-received, Bob & Rose was not a huge success in terms of audience share for ITV, and the final two episodes were relegated from prime-time to later night slots.

Plot
The story follows the life of gay school teacher Bob who is fed up with the shallowness of the gay club scene in Manchester.  A romantic at heart, Bob yearns to meet the right person and settle down. After yet another unsuccessful date, he meets Rose while they are both waiting for a taxi cab. Rose is disenchanted with her down-to-earth boyfriend and is smitten with Bob but she does not initially realise he is gay.  Subsequent episodes chart their on-off love affair which is bedeviled by the activities of Bob's best friend Holly. Holly (Jessica Hynes) is secretly in love with Bob and does everything she can to quietly interfere with Bob's relationships with men because she does not want to lose him. Privately she is lonely and her only social life is through Bob and the gay clubs he visits. When Rose suddenly appears on the scene Holly sees her as a threat, stalks her and may (or may not – the plot leaves the final matter in doubt) conspire with Bob's former boyfriend Carl to split Bob and Rose up. A situation is created which suggests Bob may have had a one-night stand with Carl and Holly deliberately preys on Rose's insecurities and creates further doubts. Eventually she outright lies to Rose.

The story also follows the attempts of Rose's mother to find a reliable boyfriend, and Bob's campaigning mother who runs a fictional gay support group called "Parents Against Homophobia" (PAH!).  The series is a gentle romantic comedy with each episode managing to end at an emotional or comic climax – as when Bob follows Rose down the street after they argue in a pub. He admits that their first heterosexual sex act has confused him but he wants to do it again. Equally confused, Rose turns towards the camera and unromantically says: "Oh bollocks!" and the credits roll.

The script takes some shrewd looks at emotions and motivations but also contrasts the different atmosphere and attitudes within gay and straight UK night clubs – as in the scene where a straight man cannot get into a straight club wearing trainers but the gay men can enter their club wearing skimpy satin sports clothes. One important scene which explains Bob's disenchantment with the gay clubs comes when he is approached by an attractive man who talks only about physical acts.  Bob, desperate to be regarded as an individual replies: "I’m a Capricorn".

The series has an up-beat ending which manages to resolve issues for all the main characters - even Holly eventually learns from her mistakes and blossoms into a person in her own right. Bob and Rose find happiness and Carl gets an angelic dream date.

Cast 
 Lesley Sharp as Rose Cooper 
 Alan Davies as Robert Gossage
 Penelope Wilton as Monica Gossage, Bob's mother.
 Jessica Hynes as Holly Vance, Bob's best friend.
 Katy Cavanagh as Anita Kendrick
 Siobhan Finneran as Marina Marquess
 Daniel Ryan as Andy Lewis
 Barbara Marten as Carol Cooper, Rose's mother.

Episodes

Reception

Awards and nominations

Controversy
As with Queer as Folk, Bob & Rose involved homosexuality as a key theme. The storyline involves a gay man falling in love with a woman and was loosely based on events in the real life of a friend of Russell T Davies. This storyline caused an uproar among some gay rights activists who felt that the series premise made it appear as if being gay was a choice or a phase, which then generated a strong counter-reaction by bisexuals who called the criticism unfair. However, the ‘Bob’ character states categorically in the script that he is not bisexual saying: "I was born gay, I’ll die gay and I’ll have a gay gravestone". He says that he was attracted to Rose as a person and not as a gender choice. He says he will ‘always look at men’ but Rose is the only woman for him.

Home media
The entire series of six episodes was released on DVD on 15 April 2002 in the United Kingdom and on 17 February 2004 in the United States. The age certificate for the DVD in the United Kingdom is 15.

In 2020, the series was added to BritBox in the UK. This is, according to Russell T Davies, the first time the series has been made available either in rerun or streaming in the UK due to complex music licensing issues. For release on BritBox, Red Productions replaced most of the music and also edited a key scene involving the viewing of the football match.

References

External links
 
 .

2001 British television series debuts
2001 British television series endings
2000s British drama television series
2000s British LGBT-related drama television series
ITV television dramas
2000s British television miniseries
Gay-related television shows
Male bisexuality in fiction
Television series by Red Production Company
Television shows written by Russell T Davies
Television shows set in Manchester
2000s British sex comedy television series
Television series created by Russell T Davies
English-language television shows